Salbari High School was established in 1950 and is located in Dhupguri Block of Dhupguri, Jalpaiguri, West Bengal.

About School
The school recently upgraded to Model School. Salbari High School is also called Nirmal Vidyalaya.

See also
Education in India
List of schools in India
Education in West Bengal

References

External links

High schools and secondary schools in West Bengal
Schools in Jalpaiguri district
Educational institutions established in 1950
1950 establishments in West Bengal